Hemipeplus marginipennis is a species of beetle in the family Mycteridae. It is found in the Caribbean Sea, Central America, North America, and South America.

References

Further reading

 

Tenebrionoidea
Articles created by Qbugbot
Beetles described in 1854